Al Maryah Community Bank is the first UAE based digital community bank to have received a banking license by the Central Bank of the United Arab Emirates to serve the individual retail banking segment and small business commercial banking segment.

History

Established in 2021, as UAE's first digital bank.

Branches
Three physical branches exist in UAE for transnational banking purposes. A full service branch at the headquarters in Al Mushrif, Abu Dhabi and a smart hub (excluding teller) services at Mall of the Emirates, Dubai. An artificial intelligence technology based SmartHub is also available at Abu Dhabi National Oil Company (ADNOC) headquarters in Abu Dhabi, with services for subscriptions to Initial Public Offering (IPO), instant cash deposits, cheque deposits, and ATM services. Also available at the ADNOC location is a multi functions kiosk (MFK) that can print cheque books and debit cards.

In lieu of a branch network, cash deposits can be made across UAE via Al Ansari Exchange branches. Other service access is provided via mobile apps available from Google and Apple app stores.

Products and services
Al Maryah Community Bank offers consumers and small business a range of financial products and services, including consumer banking; corporate and Initial public offerings.

Bank account requirements
Consumer bank accounts can be opened with zero balance.

Online brokerage
Al Maryah Community Bank currently does not offer an online equities trading platform.

Capital Markets
Initial public offerings subscriptions are available to consumer clients.

Digital wallet support
Samsung Pay and Apple Pay contactless payment methods are supported.

SWIFT Code
The SWIFT Code or BIC is E097AEXX.

See also
List of banks in the United Arab Emirates

References

External links

Al Marayah Bank website

Banks of the United Arab Emirates

Companies based in Abu Dhabi

Emirati companies established in 2021

Banks established in 2021